Dena Atlantic is an actress best known for her role as Floria Mills in the television series Oz. Atlantic has also played in the Playwrights Horizons Studio Theater.

Atlantic was a resident of Norwood Street in East Orange, New Jersey and completed East Orange High School in 1992. Atlantic was part of the Drama Club and won Junior Princess.

Filmography
 Ed .... Vivian Ghanda (2 episodes, 2002–2003)
 - The Decision (2003) TV episode .... Vivian Ghanda
 - Trapped (2002) TV episode .... Vivian Ghanda
 Brown Sugar (2002) .... Hot 97 Assistant ... aka Seven Days
 Sex and the City .... Carrie's Limo Driver (1 episode, 2002)
 - Plus One Is the Loneliest Number (2002) TV episode .... Carrie's Limo Driver
 Oz .... Floria Mills (8 episodes, 2001–2002)
 - Dream a Little Dream of Me (2002) TV episode .... Floria Mills
 - Laws of Gravity (2002) TV episode .... Floria Mills
 - Visitation (2002) TV episode .... Floria Mills
 - Famous Last Words (2001) TV episode .... Floria Mills
 - Orpheus Descending (2001) TV episode .... Floria Mills
 - Blizzard of '01 (2001) TV episode .... Floria Mills
 - Revenge Is Sweet (2001) TV episode .... Floria Mills
 - Conversions (2001) TV episode .... Floria Mills (3 more)
 Face (2002) .... Clinic Nurse
  Third Watch'' .... Mrs. Professional (1 episode, 2000)
 - Run of the Mill (2000) TV episode .... Mrs. Professional

References

External links

Year of birth missing (living people)
Living people
American television actresses
21st-century American women